Nova Zembla Island ("New Land") is an uninhabited island in the Qikiqtaaluk Region of Nunavut, Canada. It is located across the mouth of Coutts Inlet in Baffin Bay off the northeastern coast of Baffin Island.

The island was visited in 1875 by a Swedish expedition led by Adolf Erik Nordenskiöld and sponsored by the businessman Oscar Dickson.

References

External links 
 Nova Zembla Island in the Atlas of Canada - Toporama; Natural Resources Canada

Islands of Baffin Island
Islands of Baffin Bay
Uninhabited islands of Qikiqtaaluk Region